The women's water polo tournament at the 2013 World Aquatics Championships, organised by the FINA, was held in the Piscines Bernat Picornell in Barcelona, Spain from 21 July to 2 August 2013.

Spain defeated Australia 8–6 in the final match to capture their first world championship title.

Qualification
16 teams qualified for the world championships in 2013 as follows:
 The host nation
 The best 2 teams in the 2012 World League not already qualified as the host nation
 The best 4 teams in the 2012 Olympics not already qualified as the host nation or from the World League
 The best 3 teams in the 2012 European Championships not already qualified as the host nation, from the World League, or from the Olympics
 The best 2 teams in the 2013 Americas Qualification Tournament not already qualified as the host nation, from the World League, or from the Olympics
 The best 2 teams from Asia (qualification system yet to be organised) not already qualified as the host nation, from the World League, or from the Olympics
 The best team from Africa (qualification system yet to be organised) not already qualified as the host nation, from the World League, or from the Olympics
 The best team from Oceania (qualification system yet to be organised) not already qualified as the host nation, from the World League, or from the Olympics
 If no team enters from a continent or if a team qualified as the host nation, from the World League, or from the Olympics does not enter, then each vacancy shall be filled by the next highest placed team(s) from the continental qualification tournament with the following rotation: Americas, Europe, Host Continent, Asia, Oceania and Africa.

Preliminary round

Group A
All times are CEST (UTC+2).

Group B
All times are CEST (UTC+2).

Group C
All times are CEST (UTC+2).

Group D
All times are CEST (UTC+2).

Knockout stage
Championship bracket

5th place bracket

Quarterfinals qualification 
All times are CEST (UTC+2).

Quarterfinals 
All times are CEST (UTC+2).

5th–8th place classification 
All times are CEST (UTC+2).

Semifinals 
All times are CEST (UTC+2).

7th place match 
All times are CEST (UTC+2).

5th place match 
All times are CEST (UTC+2).

Bronze medal match 
All times are CEST (UTC+2).

Gold medal match 
All times are CEST (UTC+2).

Ranking and statistics

Final ranking

Team Roster
Laura Ester, Marta Bach, Anni Espar, Roser Tarragó, Mati Ortiz, Jennifer Pareja (C), Lorena Miranda, Pili Peña, Andrea Blas, Ona Meseguer, Maica García, Laura López, Patri Herrera. Head Coach: Miki Oca.

Top goalscorers

Source: SportResult

Awards

Most Valuable Player
 Jennifer Pareja

Best Goalscorer
 Lieke Klaassen – 25 goals

Best Goalkeeper
 Laura Ester

Media All-Star Team
 Laura Ester – Goalkeeper
 Barbara Bujka – Centre forward
 Rita Keszthelyi
 Lieke Klaassen
 Jennifer Pareja
 Ekaterina Prokofyeva
 Rowena Webster

References

External links
Official website
Records and statistics (reports by Omega)

2013
Women's tournament
2013 in women's water polo
Women's water polo in Spain
2013 in Spanish women's sport